Morgan is a city in the U.S. state of Utah and the county seat of Morgan County. It is part of the Ogden-Clearfield metropolitan area. It is named after Jedediah Morgan Grant, a leader in the Church of Jesus Christ of Latter-day Saints who served as an apostle and as a member of the LDS First Presidency under Brigham Young in the mid-1850s. As of the 2010 census, the city population was 3,687 people and estimated at 4,260 in 2018. Morgan is also a location where some of the movie Troll 2 was filmed in 1989.

Demographics

As of the census of 2000, there were 2,635 people, 789 households, and 665 families residing in the city. The population density was 823.8 people per square mile (317.9/km2). There were 822 housing units at an average density of 257.0 per square mile (99.2/km2). The racial makeup of the city was 99.09% White, 0.04% African American, 0.04% Native American, 0.08% Asian, 0.30% from other races, and 0.46% from two or more races. Hispanic or Latino of any race were 0.95% of the population.
There were 789 households, out of which 49.9% had children under the age of 18 living with them, 75.2% were married couples living together, 7.1% had a female householder with no husband present, and 15.6% were non-families. 15.0% of all households were made up of individuals, and 8.9% had someone living alone who was 65 years of age or older. The average household size was 3.34 and the average family size was 3.74.

In the city, the population was spread out, with 37.2% under the age of 18, 10.1% from 18 to 24, 25.1% from 25 to 44, 16.8% from 45 to 64, and 10.7% who were 65 years of age or older. The median age was 27 years. For every 100 females, there were 99.2 males. For every 100 females age 18 and over, there were 93.0 males.

The median income for a household in the city was $47,716, and the median income for a family was $53,125. Males had a median income of $42,143 versus $23,011 for females. The per capita income for the city was $16,260. About 2.0% of families and 3.4% of the population were below the poverty line, including 2.6% of those under age 18 and 3.4% of those age 65 or over.

Geography and climate
According to the United States Census Bureau, the city has a total area of 3.2 square miles (8.3 km2), all land. It has a humid continental climate with warm summers (Köppen Dfb).

See also

 List of cities and towns in Utah
 Browning Arms Company, headquartered in the nearby unincorporated community of Mountain Green.

References

External links

 

Cities in Utah
Cities in Morgan County, Utah
County seats in Utah
Ogden–Clearfield metropolitan area
Populated places established in 1860